Mechanicsville is an unincorporated community in Buckingham Township in Bucks County, Pennsylvania, United States. Mechanicsville is located at the intersection of Pennsylvania Route 413 and Mechanicsville Road.

References

Unincorporated communities in Bucks County, Pennsylvania
Unincorporated communities in Pennsylvania